On the evening of 26 December 1962, cold weather and snow in and around  had caused points to become frozen and trains were being detained at signals. About midway between Winsford and Crewe, the 13:30  to London  Mid-Day Scot, hauled by an English Electric type 4 diesel, D215, with 13 coaches and 500 passengers, was stopped at a signal but the driver found the telephone to Coppenhall Junction, the next signal box ahead, out of order. Seeing the next signal ahead he decided to proceed down towards it and use the telephone there, but too fast.

The collision killed 18 passengers; 33 other passengers and one railwayman were seriously injured. All these casualties were in the two rear coaches of the Liverpool train, which were telescoped after a coupling fractured.

Passing motorists aligned their cars so that their headlights illuminated the scene, to aid rescuers. The cattle-shed at a nearby farm was used as a temporary mortuary.

The official Ministry of Transport investigation in to the accident was led by colonel D. McMullen, who submitted his report in June 1963.

References

Railway accidents in 1962
Train collisions in England
Railway accidents and incidents in Cheshire
Railway accident deaths in England
1962 disasters in the United Kingdom
December 1962 events in the United Kingdom